The Billy Taylor House is a grassroots non-profit organization founded by residents of Providence, Rhode Island's East Side who desire to promote youth engagement for the well-being of the community as a whole. The organization has its origins in the mentorship of the late William “Billy” Taylor. Noticing the need for youth engagement in the neighborhood, ages 14–21, this group has come together in order to acquire the abandoned property that Billy used to live in, 185 Camp Street, and turn it into programming that supports youth in the pursuit of their dreams.

Mission
The mission of the Billy Taylor House is "to ignite the ambition of Providence’s most disconnected young people. We accomplish it by providing regular enrichment activities and a workforce development program that afford youth the opportunity to trade crime, violence, and poverty for social cohesion and economic vitality."

William A. Taylor
William A. Taylor was born on May 27, 1956, in Providence, Rhode Island, the eighth child of sixteen. Taylor was born with a heart condition that led to open-heart surgery at the age of two.

Taylor attended Rhode Island College where he was once President, Vice President, and then, in 1979, Treasurer of the Student Harambee group. While Treasurer, Taylor served as the Mount Hope Neighborhood Association's Director of the Youth Department. In this role, Taylor was an advocate for services and aide to the Mount Hope community youth.

After graduating from Rhode Island College in 1977, Taylor became more active in the Mount Hope community (Rochambeau Avenue to Olney Street between North Main and Camp Street). He formed a group with Pleasant Street residents called “Pleasant Street Peasants” (PSP). The PSP's main goal was "to show the Mount Hope youth that there was another world outside of the 12 blocks that most of the youth would never see beyond as youths." The PSP "eventually purchased a used bus to shuttle Mount Hope youth to movies, parties, parks, museums, talent shows, camping trips, beach trips, and other places the youth wouldn’t normally have access to."

On Saturday, May 10, 1986, at the age of 29, Taylor passed. In memory of Taylor's community service and building, the park on 124 Camp Street in Providence was named the Billy Taylor Park in his honor.

References

Non-profit organizations based in Rhode Island
Organizations based in Providence, Rhode Island